Lahat is a suburb of Ipoh, Perak, Malaysia.

References

Populated places in Perak